Mick Kenney  (born 18 January 1980) is a British musician and record producer. He gained popularity as the lead guitarist of the Extreme-Metal-Band Anaal Nathrakh where he operates under the stage name Irrumator. He is also the man behind Kordhell, one of the most popular phonk/memphis rap artists currently, with over 14 million monthly listeners on Spotifiy.

Career 
Kenney studied Illustration at the University of Birmingham.

He is a founding member of the extreme metal act Anaal Nathrakh where he started out as the lead guitarist and is now playing all the instruments. They have released a total of eleven albums since being formed in 1998.

He operates Necrodeath Studios since 1999. A small recording studio situated near the centre of Birmingham, England.

He relocated to Orange County, California, in 2007. There, he founded the clothing label Misanthropy Clothing in 2013.

In 2020 he formed the black metal band Make Them Die Slowly together with fellow musician Duncan Wilkins. They both operate under stage names. Mick Kenney as Officer R. Kordhell and Duncan Wilkins as The Void. The band was formed as a celebration of vintage gore films.

Besides those two bands he also plays in several other bands of different genres and produces music for different artists.

He also co-runs FETO Records with Shane Embury of Napalm Death fame. FETO Records have released albums by Mistress, Monkeys Are Machine Guns, Lock Up, Fukpig, Cripple Bastards, Anaal Nathrakh, and Ramesses, among others.

In 2021, Kenney started releasing phonk/Memphis rap music under the stage name Kordhell. His song "Murder in My Mind" reached the charts in Austria, Germany, Sweden, Switzerland and the United Kingdom.

Discography

Anaal Nathrakh

Kordhell 
Albums

 2021: Beat Tape 1
 2021: Beat Tape 2
 2022: PSYCHX (with Scarlxrd)
?

EPs

 2021: Phonkageddon
 Death Bound
 Wig Split
 Live Another Day

Singles

 2021: 9mm
 2021: Killers from the Northside
 2021: Glock to Your Head (ft. DeadJxhn)
 2021: Memphis Doom
 2021: SSN-571 (ft. XO1)
 2021: Live Another Day (Slowed + Reverb)
 2022: Murder in My Mind (incl. Version Slowed + Reverb)
 2022: To Hell and Back (ft. Razihel & fkbambam)
 2022: Scopin
 2022: Zep Tepi (incl. Version Slowed + Reverb)
 2022: Murder In My Mind (Sped Up)
 2022: UNHOLY (ft. Dxrk)
 2022: Dead on Arrival (ft. KUTE)
 2022: Go Hard or Get Gone (ft. DJ Paul)
 2022: FATALITY
 2022: FATALITY (Slowed + Reverb)
 2022: wtf?! (ft. Sadfriendd)
 2022: Killers From The Northside (Sped Up)
 2022: I am the King (Remix ft. L19U1D)
 2022: ONE SHOT, ONE KILL (ft. Sinizter)
 2022: ТАЙМАУТ (Remix ft. Nikitata)
 2022: LAND OF FIRE
 2022: MISA MISA! (ft. CORPSE & Scarlxrd)
 2022: MISS ME? (ft. Scarlxrd)
 2022: Like Yxu Wxuld Knxw (Autumn Trees) (ft. Corpse & Scarlxrd)
 2022: 9 In My Hand (Fast and Furious: Drift Tape/Phonk Vol 1)
 2022: MURDER PLOT (incl. Version Slowed + Reverb)
 2022: Hellraiser (Fast and Furious: Drift Tape/Phonk Vol 1)

Make Them Die Slowly 
Albums

 2020: Ferox (Feto Records)
 2020: The Bodycount Continues (Feto Records)

Singles

 2020: The Terror Begins
 2020: Slaughter High
 2020: Silent Night Murder Night
 2021: My Bloody Valentine

Mistress 

 2002: Mistress (Album, Rage of Achilles)
 2004: II: The Chronovisor (Album, Rage of Achilles)
 2005: In Disgust We Trust (Album, Earache Records)
 2007: The Glory Bitches of Doghead (Album, Feto Records)

Additional projects 
 Motionless In White - Disguise (writer/production)
 Carnifex - World War X (production)
 Aesthetic Perfection - Into The Black (writer)
 Sicarius - TBA (recording/mastering)
 Sylla - TBA (mixing/mastering)
 Tear Culture - 1899 (producer/writer/mixing/mastering)
 Carnifex - Bury Me In Blasphemy Ep (producer/recording/programming )
 Abhorrent Affliction - Forever Will He Reign (mixing/mastering)
 Bleeding Through - Love Will Kill All (producer/writer/mixing/mastering)
 Born To Murder The World - The Infinite Mirror Of Millennial Narcissism (producer/writer/mixing/mastering)
 Blood On The Scales - The Human Condition (mixing/mastering)
 Plague Bringer - TBA (mixing/mastering)
 Slytract - Slytract (mixing/mastering)
 Benediction - TBA (mixing/mastering)
 Sun Speaker - Ov Lustra (mixing/mastering)
 Aesthetic Perfection—Ebb and flow Miggiddo Remix (producer)
 Anisoptera - Spawn of Ondonata  (mixing/mastering)
 Repvblika - The Insurgent (mixing/mastering)
 Motionless In White - Graveyard Shift (writer/production)
 Eighteen Visions - XVIII (producer/mixing/mastering)
 Sicarius - Serenade of Slitting Throats (producer/mixing/mastering)
 Dawn Of Ashes - Daemonolatry Gnosis (mixing/mastering)
 Carnifex - Slow Death (producer/writer/programming)
 Dawn of Ashes - Theophany (producer/writer/mixing/mastering)
 Empyrean Throne - Chaosborne (producer/mixing/mastering)
 The Iron Son - Enemy (producer/writer/mixing/mastering)
 The Witch Was Right - The Stone (producer/writer/mixing/mastering)
 Urilia - "The Adversarial Light" (producer/writer/mixing/mastering)
 Motionless In White - Reincarnate (writer)
 The Witch Was Right - The Red Horse (producer/writer/mixing/mastering)
 Motionless In White - Infamous (writer/producer)
 Bleeding Through - The Great Fire (producer/writer/mixing/mastering)
 Suffer Well - Sorrows (producer/writer/mixing/mastering)
 Fukpig - Belief Is the Death of Intelligence (writer)
 Fukpig - Spewings from a Selfish Nation (producer/writer/mixing/mastering)
 Professor Fate - Inferno (producer/writer/mixing/mastering)
 Frost - Black 7" (producer/writer/mixing/mastering)
 Frost - Talking to God (producer/writer/mixing/mastering)
 Aborym - With No Human Intervention (guest appearance)
 Disgust - The Horror of It All (guest appearance)
 Frost - Cursed Again (producer/writer/mixing/mastering)

References

External links
 Mick Kenney personal webpage 
 Misanthropy Clothing 
 Anaal Nathrakh Myspace 

1980 births
21st-century British guitarists
Black metal musicians
Bleeding Through members
English experimental musicians
English heavy metal guitarists
English rock guitarists
Living people
People from Birmingham, West Midlands